The men's 100 metres event at the 1956 Olympic Games in Melbourne, Australia, was held at the Melbourne Cricket Ground on 23 and 24 November.  Sixty-five athletes from 31 nations competed; each nation was limited to three athletes. The final was won by American Bobby Morrow, marking the fifth consecutive victory by a different American. Hec Hogan of Australia won that country's first medal in the event since 1900. The competition took place in strong winds, with the final run into a  headwind.

Background

This was the thirteenth time the event was held, having appeared at every Olympics since the first in 1896. None of the finalists from 1952 returned. Notable entrants were Americans Bobby Morrow (NCAA champion, U.S. Olympic trial champion, and heavy favorite) and Ira Murchison (world record co-holder); Dave Sime was injured and did not make the American team.

The Bahamas, Ethiopia, Indonesia, Liberia, Malay, Singapore, and Ethiopia were represented in the event for the first time. In addition, German athletes competed as the "United Team" for the first time, though pre-World War II Germany had competed many times and West Germany had competed as "Germany" in 1952. The United States was the only nation to have appeared at each of the first thirteen Olympic men's 100 metres events.

Competition format

The event retained the four round format from 1920 to 1952: heats, quarterfinals, semifinals, and a final. There were 12 heats, of 4–6 athletes each, with the top 2 in each heat advancing to the quarterfinals. The 24 quarterfinalists were placed into 4 heats of 6 athletes. The top 3 in each quarterfinal advanced to the semifinals. There were 2 heats of 6 semifinalists, once again with the top 3 advancing to the 6-man final.

Records

Prior to the competition, the existing World and Olympic records were as follows.

Despite headwinds, Ira Murchison and Bobby Morrow each equalled the Olympic record of 10.3 seconds (hand-timed) in the quarterfinals. Morrow did it again in the semifinals.

Results

Heats

The fastest two runners in each of the twelve heats advanced to the quarterfinal round.

Heat 1

Heat 2

Heat 3

Heat 4

Heat 5

Heat 6

Heat 7

Heat 8

Heat 9

Heat 10

Heat 11

Heat 12

Quarterfinals

The fastest three runners in each of the four heats advanced to the semifinal round.

Quarterfinal 1

Quarterfinal 2

Quarterfinal 3

Quarterfinal 4

Semifinals

The fastest three runners in each of the two heats advanced to the final round.

Semifinal 1

Semifinal 2

Final
Wind -2.5 m/s

In lane 4, Bobby Morrow was out fast, sandwiched by his teammates Thane Baker in lane 6 and Ira Murchison in lane 1.  Morrow just ran away from the field.  Baker edged ahead of Murchison to get silver, and running before an Australian crowd, Hec Hogan came from behind to nip Murchison at the line. While Morrow was almost two metres ahead of Baker at the finish, the hand timing of the day gave them the same time of 10.5; the electronic timing system showed the margin to be a more accurate 0.15 of a second.

References

Athletics at the 1956 Summer Olympics
100 metres at the Olympics
Men's events at the 1956 Summer Olympics